Saddle anesthesia is a loss of sensation (anesthesia) restricted to the area of the buttocks, perineum and inner surfaces of the thighs.

Asymmetric saddle anesthesia is frequently associated with the spine-related injury cauda equina syndrome. It is also seen symmetrically with conus medullaris and may occur as a temporary side effect of a sacral extradural injection.

See also
 Pudendal anesthesia ("Saddle block")

References

Sensory systems